Bindeshwari Prasad may refer to, 

 Bindheshwari Prasad Mandal, Indian politician from Bihar who was chairman of "Mandal Commission"
 Bindeshwari Prasad Sinha, Indian archeologist and historian from Bihar
 Bindeshwari Prasad Verma, Indian politician who was 1st Speaker of Bihar legislative assembly